Walter Hazell (1843 – 12 February 1919) was a British politician and publisher.

Hazell was educated privately, and became a printer and publisher in London, running Hazell, Watson and Viney Limited.  He joined the Peace Society, serving as its treasurer, and was a founder of the Self-Help Emigration Society and the Children's Fresh Air Mission.

Hazell joined the Liberal Party, and was elected for Leicester in an 1894 by-election.  He held the seat in 1895, but was defeated in 1900.  In 1911, he became the Mayor of Holborn, and he also served as an Income Tax commissioner.

References

1843 births
1919 deaths
Liberal Party (UK) MPs for English constituencies
UK MPs 1892–1895
UK MPs 1895–1900
Mayors of places in Greater London
English publishers (people)
19th-century English businesspeople